Elliptorhina is a genus of large, flightless, wood-inhabiting cockroaches comprising ten known species, nine of those found on the island of Madagascar and one, Elliptorhina lefeuvri, found on Europa Island.

References

Cockroach genera
Insects of Madagascar